The Woman Who Gave is a lost 1918 American silent melodrama film directed by Kenean Buel and starring Evelyn Nesbit, a former Gibson girl, "It girl" model and showgirl involved in a 1906 "trial of the century" that involved a killing and an allegation of rape – whose films often exploited the fame of her life story. The film was produced and distributed by the Fox Film Corporation. The film went into release the day before fighting in World War I ended.

Cast
Evelyn Nesbit as Colette
Irving Cummings as Adrien Walcott
Robert Walker as Don Walcott
Eugene Ormonde as Prince Vacarra
Dorothy Walters as Delia Picard
Russell Thaw (Nesbit's son) as Rudolph

Reception
Like many American films of the time, The Woman Who Gave was subject to restrictions and cuts by city and state film censorship boards. For example, the Chicago Board of Censors required a cut, in Reel 1, of the intertitle "Colette is not that kind", the entire struggle incident including closeups of a man suggestively leering at a young woman, the woman's look of fear, the dragging of the woman towards the bedroom, and the two intertitles "Let me go or I'll kill myself" and "You are mine and there is no escape", in Reel 2, all closeups of men at a table looking salaciously at a young semi-nude woman on the table, the first and third scenes of the semi-nude woman on the table and a flash repetition of it in the second scene, and, in Reel 4, a man pulling the gown off of a woman's shoulder and kissing her.

See also
1937 Fox vault fire

References

External links

Film still at John Glines' Evelyn Nesbit gallery

1918 films
American silent feature films
Lost American films
Fox Film films
1918 drama films
American black-and-white films
Films directed by Kenean Buel
Silent American drama films
Melodrama films
1918 lost films
Lost drama films
1910s English-language films
1910s American films